The 1868 United States presidential election in Pennsylvania took place on November 3, 1868, as part of the 1868 United States presidential election. Voters chose 26 representatives, or electors to the Electoral College, who voted for president and vice president.

Pennsylvania voted for the Republican nominee, Ulysses S. Grant, over the Democratic nominee, Horatio Seymour. Grant won Pennsylvania by a margin of 4.4%.

Results

See also
 List of United States presidential elections in Pennsylvania

References

Pennsylvania
1868
1868 Pennsylvania elections